SS Jeremiah O'Brien is a Liberty ship built during World War II and named after the American Revolutionary War ship captain Jeremiah O'Brien (1744–1818).

Now based in San Francisco, she is a rare survivor of the 6,939-ship 6 June 1944 D-Day armada off the coast of Normandy, France.

History

World War II
Jeremiah O'Brien is a class EC2-S-CI ship, built in just 56 days at the New England Shipbuilding Corporation in South Portland, Maine and launched on 19 June 1943. Deployed in the European Theater of Operations, she made four round-trip convoy crossings of the Atlantic and was part of the Operation Neptune invasion fleet armada on D-Day.  She made 11 cross-channel round-trips to support the invasion. Following this she was sent to the Pacific Theater of Operations and saw 16 months of service in both the South Pacific and Indian Ocean calling at ports in Chile, Peru, New Guinea, the Philippines, India, China, and Australia.

Postwar
The end of the war caused most of the Liberty ships to be removed from service in 1946 and many were subsequently sold to foreign and domestic buyers. Others were retained by the U.S. Maritime Commission for potential reactivation in the event of future military conflicts. Jeremiah O'Brien was mothballed and remained in the National Defense Reserve Fleet in Suisun Bay for 33 years.

Restoration
In the 1970s, however, the idea of preserving an unaltered Liberty Ship began to be developed and, under the sponsorship of Rear Admiral Thomas J. Patterson, USMS (then the Western Regional Director of the U.S. Maritime Administration), the ship was put aside for preservation instead of being sold for scrap. In a 1994 interview printed by the Vintage Preservation magazine Old Glory, Patterson claimed the ship was steamed to her anchorage in the mothball fleet (unlike the many that were secured as unserviceable and towed into storage), and frequently placed at the back of the list for disposal which undoubtedly contributed to her survival.

An all-volunteer group, the National Liberty Ship Memorial (NLSM), acquired Jeremiah O'Brien in 1979 for restoration. At that time, she was virtually the last Liberty at the anchorage. The volunteers who campaigned to resurrect the mothballed ship (led by Captain Edward MacMichael, NLSM Executive Director, and Master) were able to get the steam plant operating while she remained in Suisun Bay. After more than three decades in mothballs, Jeremiah O'Brien's boilers were lit. The ship left the mothball fleet on 6 October 1979 bound for San Francisco Bay, drydocking, and thousands of hours of restoration work. She was the only Liberty Ship to leave the mothball fleet under her own power.

Jeremiah O'Brien then moved to Fort Mason on the San Francisco waterfront just to the west of Fisherman's Wharf to become a museum ship dedicated to the men and women who built and sailed with the United States Merchant Marine in World War II.  She was named a National Historic Mechanical Engineering Landmark by the American Society of Mechanical Engineers in 1984 and designated a National Historic Landmark in 1986. Licensed to carry tours around San Francisco Bay, it was suggested that the ship be restored to oceangoing specification. After efforts in securing sponsorship, this was accomplished in time for the 50th "D-Day" Anniversary Celebrations in 1994.

50th Anniversary of D-Day
In 1994, Jeremiah O'Brien steamed through the Golden Gate bound for France.  She went down the West Coast, through the Panama Canal, and crossed the Atlantic for the first time since World War II. She stopped first in London, England, where she was berthed adjacent to HMS Belfast, then went on to Portsmouth for the D-Day +50 celebrations before she continued on to Normandy, where Jeremiah O'Brien and her crew (a volunteer crew of veteran World War II-era sailors and a few cadets from the California Maritime Academy) participated in the 50th Anniversary of Operation Overlord, the Allied invasion of Western Europe. She was the only large ship from the original Normandy flotilla to return for the event.

Today
Docked at Pier 45, she makes several passenger-carrying daylight cruises each year in the San Francisco Bay, and occasional voyages to more distant ports such as Seattle and San Diego.

Footage of the ship's engine was used in the 1997 film Titanic to depict the ill-fated ship's own triple-expansion engines. The engine is very similar to the engines on board the RMS Titanic; two of her engines were triple expansion marine steam engines, albeit Titanic engines were four cylinders as opposed to three.

The ship is completely restored to its original World War II configuration.  Most areas are open to the public, including the engine room, bridge, and cargo holds. Modernization has been kept to a minimum and mostly involves systems related to safety, communications, and navigation.

In 2009, Jeremiah O'Brien was dry docked inside Eureka at Pier 70.

On 23 May 2020, SS Jeremiah O'Brien and USS Pampanito were threatened by a 4-alarm fire at a warehouse structure next to where Jeremiah O'Brien was berthed at San Francisco's Pier 45, but both vessels were undamaged due to the actions of the local firefighters.  The fireboat St. Francis is credited with saving the ship. The ship was temporarily moved to Pier 35 during the cleanup process.

Gallery

See also
Liberty ship
List of Liberty ships
Nash – last surviving D-Day Army ship
Victory ship

Notes

References

External links 

Liberty ships
Museum ships in San Francisco
1943 ships
Ships built in Portland, Maine
Ships on the National Register of Historic Places in California
World War II merchant ships of the United States
United States Merchant Marine
Golden Gate National Recreation Area
Military and war museums in California
National Historic Landmarks in the San Francisco Bay Area
National Register of Historic Places in San Francisco
Battle of the Atlantic
Naval battles of World War II involving the United States
Naval battles of World War II involving the United Kingdom
Naval battles of World War II involving Germany
American Theater of World War II
World War II on the National Register of Historic Places in California